Elsternwick Metropolitan Fire Brigade Station is a heritage-listed former fire station at 2-4 Selwyn Street, Elsternwick, Victoria, Australia. It was added to the Australian Commonwealth Heritage List on 22 June 2004.

History 

Elsternwick village was laid out by surveyor Robert Hoddle in 1851, and was further subdivided in 1856. Until the land boom of the 1880s, the Elsternwick area primarily consisted of rural estates and was sparsely populated. The land boom brought more modern settlement patterns, with rural estates subdivided into suburban housing and commercial lots. The land on which the former fire station is located was originally purchased by Hugh Moore in the 1860s as part of his country estate. He subdivided his plot in 1888, creating 71 building plots and establishing a row of commercial buildings on the street front. By 1892, the land at 2-4 Selwyn Street was being used as a wood and coal yard. It was then sold to the Metropolitan Fire Brigade in 1895, for the construction of the fire station.

Prior to the end of the 19th century, firefighting in Melbourne had been mostly haphazard, with no coordination of efforts throughout the metropolitan area. The first firefighting service in Melbourne was established by the Fire Protection Society in 1845, with a series of volunteer brigades being formed in major suburban centres from the 1850s. By the 1860s and 1870s more professional outfits had been established, primarily by commercial, industrial and insurance concerns, to help protect their assets. Due to the ad hoc nature of these services, however, their effectiveness was ultimately limited.

In 1885, a Victorian Government appointed Select Committee recommended the formation of a formal and coordinated fire fighting service for Melbourne, culminating in the Fire Brigades Act of 1891. The MFB was created and took over the Insurance Companies' Fire Brigade station at 447 Little Bourke Street, until its new headquarters, the Eastern Hill Fire Station in Gisborne Street, East Melbourne, was completed in November 1893.

In 1892 the MFB implemented a plan to establish a wide network of fire stations throughout the Melbourne metropolitan area, thirty-six in all. Thirty-two of these were to be constructed from scratch. From 1892 to 1896 these stations were established at a total cost to Victoria of 77,750 pounds. A number of different architects were engaged to design fire stations during this period, resulting in a proliferation of styles and forms.

The Elsternwick station was completed in 1895. It was to be complemented by another, more substantial, station at nearby Caulfield. A volunteer fire brigade had been established in Elsternwick in 1890, operating out of basic premises opposite the Post Office. The volunteer service was taken over by the MFB the following year when the Fire Brigades Act was passed in 1891.

The land for the Elsternwick Station was being leased by the Victorian Railway Commissioner, and a deal was made to provide use of the site to the MFB, although it was later purchased outright. It was initially proposed to construct a simple weatherboard station at Elsternwick but, after deputations to the MFB from members of the local municipality, it was upgraded to a more substantial timber building. In 1895, former Victorian Public Works architect, John Thomas Kelleher, was appointed to provide designs for the Elsternwick station, as well as those at Flemington and Yarraville.

Kelleher had worked in the Victorian Public Service from 1863-1894. During that time he had developed a strong reputation, expressed most solidly in his designs for buildings such as the Flemington (Flemington Post Office), Fitzroy and Bairnsdale Post Offices, as well as the Warragul, Benalla. and Bairnsdale courthouses. His most famous design, however, was probably that for his own home, Athole (built 1889), in Carnegie, which is in the Register of the National Estate. Unrestricted by the conservatism of the public service, Kelleher's home expresses an eclectic array of design styles and stylistic motifs, including strong Moorish influences.

It is possible that the fire station designs he created for the MFB were the first of his private practice career, as he had left the public service in 1894. The building was completed at a total cost of 769 pounds, 125 of which was for the land.

The Elsternwick Fire Station was in full service by 1895. It operated as a fire station until 1926, when it was closed, possibly superseded by modernisation of the MFB network. It was subsequently sold to JJ Webster Pty Ltd, who owned timber yards adjacent to the station. After World War II it was sold again and converted into a motor garage, operating under the name of "Esquire Motors". During this period a number of key renovations and conversions were carried out on the building.

The building was acquired in 1989 by the Australian Broadcasting Corporation as part of ABC TV's Elsternwick complex.

Description 
Metropolitan Fire Brigade Station is at 2-4 Selwyn Street, Elsternwick.

The former Metropolitan Fire Brigades (MFB) fire station at 2-4 Selwyn Street, Elsternwick, built in 1895, is an example of a small outer suburban fire station, one of many built in the Melbourne metropolitan area from 1892-1940. It retains many of the principal characteristics of a small late-19th century fire station, and is an example of the work of prominent Victorian architect J/ T. Kelleher.

The former Elsternwick Fire Station is a single storey building built from black body bricks with red brick dressings. It bears close resemblance to the other two MFB stations designed by J. T/ Kelleher in 1895. The most prominent of these similarities is the large Moorish horseshoe arch which marked the entrance to the engine room. At the former Elsternwick station this horseshoe arch, featuring rusticated limestone and fine axed basalt, remains the most dominant feature of the facade. The arch is presently in-filled with solid timber panelling, with a single standard sized door providing entry to the building. It is surmounted by an Anglo-Dutch gable and a heraldic emblem, probably that of the MFB.

The facade also features freestone, dressed and axe finished with red tuckpointing. The sills and stonework to the lower side of the cartway entry are dressed and axe finished bluestone. The roofing is corrugated iron, although the original appears to have been slate with terra cotta ridge crestings.

The interior bears little resemblance to the original building fitout. The most conspicuous change is the renovation of the interior, including the engine room, into a mechanic's workshop and showroom. Some of the original pressed metal centrepieces and panelled ceilings have been retained. Further cosmetic changes to the interior have taken place since 1989, with the buildings current use as office and studio space for the Australian Broadcasting Corporation.

Of the three MFB stations designed by Kelleher - Elsternwick, Yarraville and Flemington - in 1895, all remain extant today. Neither Yarraville nor Flemington are listed in the Register of the National Estate (RNE) or the Victorian Heritage Register (VHR). This building type is important in its ability to illustrate the portfolio of J T Kelleher, an important figure in Victoria's architectural history, especially as perhaps the first examples of his work after leaving the public service. In stylistic terms, the three stations are quite similar, but in condition and integrity Elsternwick is superior to Yarraville, and Flemington is superior in turn to Elsternwick. Nonetheless, Elsternwick remains in good condition and, at least from the exterior, strongly illustrates the main features of its type, and late 19th Century metropolitan fire stations as a broad group.

It is uncertain as to how many of the 36 fire stations established by the MFB during the 1892-1896 remain today. The only other station from this period to be entered in either the RNE or the VHR is the Eastern Hill station, which was established as the MFB headquarters. Therefore, the former MFB station at Elsternwick is important as one of the few Melbourne metropolitan stations from the 1892-1896 period to be listed in the RNE or VHR, and provides a significant link to this period in the development of firefighting services. Later periods are represented by the Port Melbourne and Hawthorn, built , and the Elwood and Carlton stations, built 1926-28. The original Insurance Companies' Fire Brigade Station at 447 Lt Bourke St is believed to be no longer extant.

Condition and integrity 

The former fire station is in good condition. Its internal integrity is compromised by a number of changes that have occurred since the station closed in 1927. These changes pertain strongly to the building's use as a motor garage and showroom in the 1945-1989 period. It is currently used by ABC TV as office and studio space. Externally, the integrity is good, although the present roofing is not the original fabric (2001).

Heritage listing 
The former MFB Fire Station in Elsternwick was built in 1895 to the design of former Public Works architect J. T. Kelleher. It was one of 36 stations established across metropolitan Melbourne between 1892 and 1896 by the newly formed Metropolitan Fire Brigades (MFB), as part of a wide fire-fighting network across Melbourne. The place is therefore significant for its ability to illustrate the historical development of fire-fighting services in Melbourne, especially the expansion of the newly-formed MFB into Melbourne's wider reaches in the 1892-1896 period. It is also important to the history of the local area, contributing to the story of Elsternwick's development, especially in terms of its public infrastructure.

The former MFB fire station in Elsternwick is also significant as an example of a modest late 19th Century fire station in suburban Melbourne. The horseshoe entry arch, the station's most prominent feature, particularly illustrates the building's function.

References

Bibliography 
 Ward, A. 1990. Caulfield Conservation Study. NEGP report for the City of Caulfield.
 Willingham, A. 1998. The Former Elsternwick Fire Station, 2-4 Selwyn St Elsternwick: a cultural history and assessment of cultural significance. Report prepared for the Australian Broadcasting Corporation.

Attribution 

Commonwealth Heritage List places in Victoria
Elsternwick, Victoria
Fire stations in Victoria (Australia)
Articles incorporating text from the Australian Heritage Database
Heritage-listed buildings in Melbourne
Buildings and structures in the City of Glen Eira
Fire stations completed in 1895
1895 establishments in Australia